The Hand and Shears is a Grade II listed public house at 1 Middle Street, Smithfield, London.

It is on the Campaign for Real Ale's National Inventory of Historic Pub Interiors.

It was built in the early-mid 19th century.

It was named after the former Bartholomew Fair, held at Smithfield for centuries, at which the Lord Mayor of London would come and cut a piece of cloth with a pair of shears to announce that the fair had begun.

References

Grade II listed pubs in the City of London
National Inventory Pubs
Smithfield, London